Susan Somers-Willett (born 1973) is an American author and academic working as a professor literature and creative writing at the University of Texas at Austin.

Education 
Somers-Willett earned an A.B. from Duke University, followed by a Master of Arts in creative writing and PhD in American literature from the University of Texas at Austin.

Career 
Somers-Willett is the author of two books of poetry: Quiver (Virginia Quarterly Review Series, University of Georgia Press, 2009) and Roam (Crab Orchard Series in Poetry Open Competition Awards, SIU Press, 2006). She is also the author of a book of scholarly criticism, The Cultural Politics of Slam Poetry: Race, Identity, and the Performance of Popular Verse in America (University of Michigan Press, 2009), which was the first scholarly monograph on the poetry slam and which focuses on African American performance in slam and spoken word poetry.

She has taught at Carnegie Mellon University, Montclair State University, and the University of Illinois Urbana-Champaign, where she was an Andrew W. Mellon Postdoctoral Fellow in the Humanities. She currently works at the University of Texas at Austin.

Personal life 
From 2003 to 2013, Somers-Willett was married to author and screenwriter Ernest Cline, with whom she has one child.

Selected works
 The Cultural Politics of Slam Poetry: Race, Identity, and the Performance of Popular Verse in America, University of Michigan Press, 2009.
 Quiver Virginia Quarterly Review Series, University of Georgia Press, 2009.
 Roam Crab Orchard Series Open Competition Award, Southern Illinois University Press, 2006.

References

External links
 Official Website
 Susan Somers-Willett's poem "On Cancer" in Gulf Coast: A Journal of Literature and Fine Arts (25.1).

Living people
Year of birth missing (living people)
University of Texas at Austin College of Liberal Arts alumni
Carnegie Mellon University faculty
American women poets
Michener Center for Writers alumni
Duke University alumni
1973 births